Lake Kulul is the lowest point in Eritrea. Located in the Northern Red Sea Region, it lies in the Eritrean portion of the Afar Depression.

References

Bodies of water of Eritrea
Northern Red Sea Region